The taxon Fernandezia robusta refers to 2 species of orchid:
 Fernandezia robusta Klotzsch ex Rchb.f., a synonym of Lockhartia lunifera,
 Fernandezia robusta Bateman, a synonym of Lockhartia oerstedii